In Search of Sunrise 4: Latin America is the fourth compilation album in the In Search of Sunrise series mixed by Dutch trance producer and DJ Tiësto, released on 13 April 2005.

Track listing

Charts

Weekly charts

Year-end charts

References

External links
 
 

Tiësto compilation albums
2005 compilation albums